Vardanjan may refer to:

Places
Vardanjan Rural District, in Shahrekord County, Chaharmahal and Bakhtiari Province, Iran 
Vardanjan, Iran, a village in Shahrekord County, Chaharmahal and Bakhtiari Province, Iran
Vardanjan, Farsan, a village in Farsan County, Chaharmahal and Bakhtiari Province, Iran

People
Gurgen Vardanjan (born 1963), figure skater and figure skating coach
Tigran Vardanjan (born 1989), figure skater

See also
Vardanyan